The Burton-on-Trent Open also called the Burton-on-Trent Open Tennis Tournament was a men's and women's grass court tennis tournament founded in August 1883. It was first staged at the Ind Coope Ground at Burton upon Trent, East Staffordshire, England and ran till 1905 when it was abolished.

History
The Burton-on-Trent Open was a men;s and women's grass court tennis tournament founded in August 1883. The tournament was held through to 1939 when it was abolished. The gentlemans singles competed for the Ratcliff Challenge Cup. Former winners of the men's singles included: Walter William Chamberlain, Henry Guy Nadin, Edward Roy Allen and Sydney Howard Smith. Previous women's singles title winners included: Hilda Lane, Violet Pinckney and Alice Pickering.

Venue
The tournament was held on the Ind Coope Ground, Burton-upon-Trent throughout its duration, Ind Coope & Co's were a local brewery firm that also provided some of the tournaments prizes. The Ind Coope Ground was also used by Staffordshire County Cricket Club.

References

Defunct tennis tournaments in the United Kingdom
Grass court tennis tournaments